Hrafn Jökulsson (1 November 1965 – 17 September 2022) was an Icelandic writer, journalist, politician and competitive chess player. He was best known for his writing, both as a writer and a journalist. He started working at Tíminn at the age of fifteen and later held the position of editor of Alþýðublaðið and Mannlíf. He was a deputy member of Alþingi in 1995 for the Social Democratic Party. In 1998, he was one of the founders and later chairman of the Skákfélagið Hrókurinn, a competitive chess club.

Personal life
Hrafn was the son of journalist Jóhanna Kristjónsdóttir and writer Jökull Jakobsson. Among his siblings were writers Elísabet Jökulsdóttir and Illugi Jökulsson.

In 2022, Hrafn was diagnosed with a fourth stage cancer. On 22 August, he married Oddný Halldórsdóttir. He died from the illness on 17 September 2022, at the age of 56.

Bibliography
1991: Húsinu fylgdu tveir kettir
1993: Þegar hendur okkar snertast
1999: Miklu meira en mest
2007: Þar sem vegurinn endar

References

External links
 at Alþingi 

1965 births
2022 deaths
20th-century Icelandic people
21st-century Icelandic people
David Oddson
Politicians from Reykjavík
People from Reykjavík
Icelandic journalists
Icelandic writers